The 2015 Edo State House of Assembly election was held on April 11, 2015, to elect members of the Edo State House of Assembly in Nigeria. All the 24 seats were up for election in the Edo State House of Assembly.

Results

Ovia North-East II 
APC candidate Bright Osayande won the election.

Ovia North-East I 
APC candidate Sunday Osazimwede won the election.

Etsako East 
APC candidate Kingsley Ugabi won the election.

Etsako Central 
APC candidate Damian Lawani won the election.

Etsako West II 
APC candidate Yakubu Gowon Jerry won the election.

Etsako West I 
APC candidate Gani Audu won the election.

Oredo West 
APC candidate Chris Okaeben won the election.

Oredo East 
APC candidate Iyoha Osaigbovo won the election.

Ikpoba Okha 
APC candidate Henry Okhuarobo won the election.

Egor 
APC candidate Crosby Eribo won the election.

Uhunmwonde 
APC candidate Elizabeth Aitivie won the election.

Akoko-Edo I 
APC candidate Kabir Adjoto won the election.

Akoko-Edo II 
APC candidate Emma Agbaje won the election.

Owan East 
APC candidate Foly Ogedengbe won the election.

Owan West 
APC candidate Asein Ojo won the election.

Esan West 
PDP candidate Monday Ehighalua won the election.

Esan Central 
APC candidate Victor Edoror won the election.

Esan North-East I 
PDP candidate Patrick Iluobe won the election.

Esan North-East II 
PDP candidate Ezehi Igban won the election.

Esan South East 
APC candidate Festus Edughele won the election.

Igueben 
APC candidate Justin Okoloboh won the election.

Orhionmwon II 
APC candidate Asoro Osadebamwen Roland won the election.

Orhionmwon I 
APC candidate Okunbor Nosayaba won the election.

Ovia South-West 
APC candidate Sunday Aghedo won the election.

References 

Edo State House of Assembly elections